The Jammu bent-toed gecko (Cyrtopodion mansarulum) is a species of gecko, a lizard in the family Gekkonidae. The species is endemic to northern India.

Geographic range
C. mansarulum is found in the Indian state of Jammu and Kashmir. It may also occur in adjacent northern Pakistan.

Reproduction
C. mansarulum is oviparous.

References

Further reading
Agarwal, Ishan; Bauer, Aaron M.; Jackman, Todd R.; Karanth, Praveen (2014). "Cryptic species and Miocene diversification of Palaearctic naked-toed geckos (Squamata Gekkonidae) in the Indian dry zone". Zoologica Scripta 43 (5): 455–471. (Cyrtopodion mansarulum, new combination).
Duda PL, Sahi DN (1978). "Cyrtodactylus mansarulus n. sp. from Jammu". Indian Science Congress Proceedings 65 (3C): 211. (Cyrtodactylus mansarulus, new species).
Rösler, Herbert (2000) "Kommentierte Liste der rezent, subrezent und fossil bekannten Geckotaxa (Reptilia: Gekkonomorpha) ". Gekkota 2: 28–153. (Cyrtodactylus mansarulus, p. 66). (in German).

Fauna of Pakistan
Cyrtopodion
Reptiles described in 1978